Qaderabad (also Romanized as Qāderābād; also known as Mādīn and Deh-e Mādīn) is a village in Dust Mohammad Rural District, in the Central District of Hirmand County, Sistan and Baluchestan Province, Iran. At the 2006 census, its population was 213, in 32 families.

References 

Populated places in Hirmand County